In Canada, a number of sites and structures are named for Governors General of the country, the Canadian monarch's representative in the country.

Governors and Governors General of New France (1627–1760)

Samuel de Champlain

Charles de Montmagny

Louis d'Ailleboust de Coulonge

The Comte de Frontenac et de Palluau

Vaudreuil family

The Marquis de Beauharnois

The Marquis de la Jonquière

Governors and Governors General of Canada (1760–1867)

Sir Jeffery Amherst

The Lord Dorchester

Sir Frederick Haldimand

Robert Prescott

Sir George Prévost

Sir Gordon Drummond

Sir John Coape Sherbrooke

The Duke of Richmond

The Earl of Dalhousie

Sir James Kempt

The Lord Aylmer

The Earl of Gosford

Sir John Colborne

The Lord Sydenham

Sir Charles Metcalfe

The Earl of Elgin and Kincardine

Sir Edmund Walker Head

Governors General of Canada (since 1867)

The Viscount Monck

The Lord Lisgar

The Earl of Dufferin

Marquess of Lorne

The Marquess of Lansdowne

The Lord Stanley of Preston

The Earl of Aberdeen

The Earl of Minto

The Earl Grey

The Duke of Connaught and Strathearn

The Duke of Devonshire

The Lord Byng of Vimy

The Viscount Willingdon

The Earl of Bessborough

The Lord Tweedsmuir

The Earl of Athlone

The Viscount Alexander of Tunis

Vincent Massey

Georges Vanier

Roland Michener

Jules Léger

Edward Schreyer

Jeanne Sauvé

Ray Hnatyshyn

Roméo LeBlanc

Adrienne Clarkson

Michaëlle Jean

David Johnston

Julie Payette

Lieutenant governors

British Columbia
 Barnard Island and Mount Barnard – Francis Stillman Barnard
 Dewdney, Dewdney Creek, Dewdney Flats, Dewdney Island, Dewdney Peak, Dewdney Street (Vancouver), Dewdney Trail, Dewdney Trunk Road, and Mount Dewdney – Edgar Dewdney
 Lotbinière Island – Henri-Gustave Joly de Lotbinière
 Mount Trutch, Trutch Island, and Trutch Street (Vancouver) – Joseph Trutch
 Prior Island, Prior Lake, Prior Peak, and Prior Street (Vancouver) – Edward Gawler Prior

New Brunswick 
 Beaubassin East – Michel Leneuf de la Vallière de Beaubassin (governor of Acadia)
 Campbellton – Sir Archibald Campbell
 Campobello Island – Lord William Campbell (governor of Nova Scotia)
 Carleton County – Thomas Carleton
 Menneval – Louis-Alexandre des Friches de Menneval (governor of Acadia)
 Mount Denys – Nicolas Denys (governor of Acadia)
 Mount DesBarres – Joseph Frederick Wallet Des Barres (governor of Prince Edward Island)

Newfoundland and Labrador 

 Bannerman Lake, Bannerman Park (St. John's), and Bannerman River – Alexander Bannerman
 Blaketown – Henry Arthur Blake
 Byron Bay – John Byron
 Cavendish – Cavendish Boyle
 Champney's Cove and Williamsport – Ralph Champneys Williams
 Cochrane Pond – Thomas John Cochrane
 Glover Island and Glovertown – John Hawley Glover
 Hamilton Falls and Hamilton River – Charles Hamilton (now known as Churchill Falls and Churchill River)
 Mount Musgrave, Musgrave Harbour, and Musgravetown – Anthony Musgrave
 Palliser Point – Hugh Palliser
 Terrenceville – Terence O'Brien

Nova Scotia 

 Belleisle – Alexandre Le Borgne de Belle-Isle (governor of Port Royal)
 CFB Cornwallis, Cornwallis River, Cornwallis Square, and Cornwallis Valley – Edward Cornwallis
 Mulgrave – George Phipps, 2nd Marquess of Normanby
 Parrsboro – John Parr
 Pereaux – François-Marie Perrot (governor of Acadia)
 Wentworth, Wentworth Creek, Wentworth Lake, and Wentworth Valley – Sir John Wentworth, 1st Baronet

Prince Edward Island 
 DesBarres Point – Joseph Frederick Wallet Des Barres
 Huntley River – Henry Vere Huntley
 Murray Harbour and Murray River – James Murray (governor of Quebec)
 Tryon, Tryon Head, and Tryon River – William Tryon (governor of New York and North Carolina)

See also
 List of Governors General of Canada
 Royal eponyms in Canada
 List of awards named after Governors General of Canada

Notes

References

 
 

Monarchy in Canada
Lists of eponyms